"Learn to Fly" is a song by American rock band Foo Fighters. It was released as the lead single from their third studio album There Is Nothing Left to Lose (1999) in October 1999.  It was the band's first song to enter the Billboard Hot 100, as well as their second-highest charting song on the Hot 100, peaking at number 19. It also peaked within the top 40 in Australia, Canada, Hungary, the Netherlands, New Zealand, Poland and the United Kingdom. The song's music video won Best Short Form Video award at the 43rd Grammy Awards in 2001.

Release and reception
"Learn to Fly" was originally released as a promo-only single. It was officially released as a two-disc CD set in the UK and Australia, as well as in Europe, and promotional singles were also released in other countries such as the US for radio play. 

In the US, it was the band's first appearance on the Billboard Hot 100, charting at number 19, and was the band's first number one on the Billboard Modern Rock Tracks chart. 

It is also their highest-charting on the Billboard Hot 100 Airplay chart, along with the 1996 hit "Big Me", reaching number 13. 

The song set the record for most weeks (13) at number one on the Canadian rock radio charts.

Music video
The music video for the song was directed by Jesse Peretz and won the Grammy Award for Best Short Form Music Video in  2001. 

It takes place on a commercial airliner, parodying the movie Airplane!, and by extension, the films Airport 1975 and its sequel Airport '77, interspersed with a mock concert footage of the band shown as an in-flight movie. The background elevator music is The Moog Cookbook's version of "Everlong". 

Two airline cabin cleaners (played by Jack Black, and Kyle Gass from Tenacious D) smuggle and hide their narcotics, labelled "World Domination brand 'Erotic' Sleeping Powder", in the coffee-maker. The flight attendants do not notice the narcotics when they use the coffee-maker, and everyone who drinks the resulting coffee becomes incapacitated. The take-off sequence, in addition to the crew members hiding ulterior criminal motives, are a near shot-by-shot homage to the film Airport '77. 

The band, having avoided the coffee (choosing liquor instead), mirroring Karen Black's role in Airport 1975, find themselves forced to land the plane. For the video, each band member (Dave Grohl, Nate Mendel, and Taylor Hawkins) portrays himself as well as several other roles, including Hawkins as an attractive flight attendant and Grohl as an FBI agent who arrests the two cabin cleaners when they attempt to smuggle more of their narcotics.

2015 tribute video
On July 30, 2015, a video was published on YouTube of 1,000 Italian musicians in Cesena, Italy all playing and singing the song in unison, followed by a plea for the Foo Fighters to come play a concert in Cesena. By August 16, it had gained more than 33 million views.

On July 31, Dave Grohl responded, in Italian, thanking the makers for "the beautiful video" and adding "Thank you so much. We're coming, I swear. We'll see each other soon." On November 3, 2015, in response, Foo Fighters performed a twenty-seven-song concert in Cesena for approximately 3,000 people, starting their set with "Learn to Fly".

The group assembled for the stunt have performed subsequently under the name Rockin' 1000, and have been described as the "biggest band in the world."

In August 2015, nearly 16 years after its initial release, the single entered the Austrian Singles Chart at number 69 and the Swiss Singles Chart at number 41.

Other versions 
A live version recorded in Sydney, Australia, on January 24, 2000, was released on the Australian "Generator" single and CD 1 of "Breakout".

Critical reception
Greg Kot of Rolling Stone referred to the song as a "guilt-free power ballad". He noted that "on 'Learn to Fly', the big guitars and arching melody crush all quibbles. Some grunge romantics may even hear it as a touching little hymn to [Nirvana]". 

In 2020, Kerrang ranked the song number 11 on their list of the 20 greatest Foo Fighters songs, and in 2021, American Songwriter ranked the song number three on their list of the 10 greatest Foo Fighters songs.

Track listings and formats
 AUS / UK CD Single 
 "Learn to Fly"  – 3:58
 "Iron and Stone"  – 2:52
 "Have a Cigar"  – 3:58

 EU 7" Vinyl / EU CD 1 / UK Cassette
 "Learn to Fly"  – 3:58
 "Have a Cigar"  – 3:58

 EU CD 2
 "Learn to Fly"  – 3:58
 "Make a Bet"  – 3:28
 "Have a Cigar"  – 3:58

Credits and personnel
 Dave Grohl – lead vocals, electric guitar
 Nate Mendel – bass
 Taylor Hawkins – drums, lead vocals on "Have A Cigar"
 Brian May –  electric guitar on "Have A Cigar"
 Foo Fighters – composition, lyrics, producer, performer
 Adam Kasper – producer, recording
 Andy Wallace – mixing
 Ted Reiger – second engineer
 Bob Ludwig – mastering

Credits and personnel adapted from "Learn to Fly" CD single liner notes.

Charts

Weekly charts

Certifications and sales

Release history

References

External links

1999 songs
1999 singles
Foo Fighters songs
Song recordings produced by Adam Kasper
Songs written by Dave Grohl
Grammy Award for Best Short Form Music Video
RCA Records singles
Songs written by Nate Mendel
Songs written by Taylor Hawkins